Alexander "Alex" Hay MacDowall (born 22 January, 1991) is a British auto racing driver. He is currently competing in the 2014 FIA World Endurance Championship season for Aston Martin Racing.

Racing career

Early career
MacDowall was born in Carlisle.  He began his racing career in T Cars in 2005, and remained there for 2006. In 2007 he stepped up to the Renault Clio Cup with Total Control Racing, finishing 32nd overall. He then finished third in the end of year Winter series. In 2008 he improved in the main series to finish seventh overall, and finished third once again in the Winter series. In 2009 he took four victories and finished as runner-up to Phil Glew.

British Touring Car Championship

Silverline Chevrolet (2010–2011)

MacDowall's 2009 Clio Cup performances impressed top British Touring Car Championship (BTCC) teams Motorbase Performance, RML and West Surrey Racing, who gave him tests over the winter break ahead of the 2010 season. In March 2010 it was announced that MacDowall would race a Chevrolet Cruze for the RML-run Silverline Chevrolet factory-supported team, as teammate to Jason Plato. In a wet qualifying session at Snetterton he became the youngest polesitter in the championship's history but the car's gearlever broke as he changed up into second gear at the start of the first race. He failed to finish in the points in either of the other two races. His rookie year was a success though, with two podiums, two pole positions and a fastest lap en route to 10th overall in the championship. Macdowall continued with Chevrolet in the British Touring Car Championship for 2011, ending the season 9th in the standings with 100 points and 3 podium finishes.

World Touring Car Championship

bamboo-engineering (2012–2013)

In February 2012 it was announced that MacDowall would race for bamboo-engineering in the WTCC for the 2012 season where his teammate would be Pasquale Di Sabatino. He scored points in his first race at Monza and again in the second race of the day. He left Italy in a three-way tie for the Yokohama Drivers' Trophy championship lead. He took his first win in the Yokohama Independents' Trophy at the Race of Austria. Di Sabatino was replaced by Michel Nykjær for the Race of Brazil and MacDowall missed out on an independent win to Nykjær in race one. His result in race one combined with two non-scores for Yokohama Trophy rival Franz Engstler elevated him to fourth in the standings, 12 points behind Stefano D'Aste. He took his second independent win of the season in race one of the Race of Japan. He went into the final race weekend in Macau with a slim chance of taking the Yokohama Trophy title. In qualifying he secured the reversed grid pole position for race two; at the start of the race he lost the lead to Norbert Michelisz but passed him again to take the lead. Both drivers were then overtaken by Alain Menu and MacDowall dropped to fourth when a tap from Yvan Muller spun MacDowall into the barriers after exiting the high speed Mandarin corner. Muller later apologised for the incident but no penalties were issued to either driver. MacDowall dropped back down to fifth in the Yokohama Trophy standings and was classified in 10th in the drivers' championship, tied on points with Mehdi Bennani but behind on countback due to Bennani's podium at the Race of Hungary.

MacDowall stayed with Bamboo Engineering for the 2013 season, partnering new teammate James Nash. He finished on the overall podium for the first time in the WTCC when he came third in race one of the Race of Italy, also taking the independents' victory.

World Endurance Championship

Aston Martin Racing (2014–)
In February 2014 Alex announced that he would compete for Aston Martin Racing, the factory Aston Martin racing team, in the FIA World Endurance Championship. This marked MacDowall's first competitive start in GT racing and saw him race at some of the world's most famous circuits including Le Mans, Spa, Silverstone and Interlagos. MacDowall competed in the GTE Pro category alongside former Bamboo teammate Darryl O'Young and experienced GT racer Fernando Rees.

Racing record

Complete British Touring Car Championship results
(key) (Races in bold indicate pole position – 1 point awarded in first race) (Races in italics indicate fastest lap – 1 point awarded all races) (* signifies that driver lead race for at least one lap – 1 point given)

Complete World Touring Car Championship results
(key) (Races in bold indicate pole position) (Races in italics indicate fastest lap)

† – Did not finish the race, but was classified as he completed over 90% of the race distance.

Complete FIA World Endurance Championship results
(key) (Races in bold indicate pole position; races in
italics indicate fastest lap)

Complete British GT Championship results
(key) (Races in bold indicate pole position) (Races in italics indicate fastest lap)

24 Hours of Le Mans results

Complete European Le Mans Series results

‡ Half points awarded as less than 75% of race distance was completed.

References

External links 

 
 

1991 births
Living people
English racing drivers
Sportspeople from Carlisle, Cumbria
British Touring Car Championship drivers
World Touring Car Championship drivers
FIA World Endurance Championship drivers
24 Hours of Le Mans drivers
Blancpain Endurance Series drivers
European Le Mans Series drivers
British GT Championship drivers
Ginetta GT4 Supercup drivers
Renault UK Clio Cup drivers
Mini Challenge UK drivers
Aston Martin Racing drivers
W Racing Team drivers
Lamborghini Squadra Corse drivers
Craft-Bamboo Racing drivers